Chronis can be a first name. Notable people with the first name include:

 Chronis Aidonidis (born 1928), Greek singer
 Chronis Exarhakos (1932–1984), Greek actor

Chronis can be a surname. Notable people with the surname include:

 Andreas Chronis (born 1989), Greek-American soccer player
 Christopher Chronis (born 1961), Australian fashion designer
 Iason Chronis (born 1980), Dutch DJ & producer (known professionally as Mason)
 Katherine Chronis, American performance artist
 Panayiotis Chronis (born 1984), Greek football player
 Sarah Chronis (born 1986), Dutch actress